Kathleen D. Vohs is an American psychologist and behavioral economist. She is Distinguished McKnight University Professor and Land O'Lakes Chair in Marketing in the Carlson School of Management at the University of Minnesota. In 2015, she was named an ISI Highly Cited Researcher, and in 2018, she received the Distinguished Scientific Contribution Award from the Society for Consumer Psychology.

References

External links
Faculty page
Profile at Social Psychology Network

Living people
American women psychologists
21st-century American psychologists
American women economists
Behavioral economists
Carlson School of Management faculty
Gustavus Adolphus College alumni
Dartmouth College alumni
21st-century  American economists
Management scientists
Year of birth missing (living people)